The 2017–18 Melbourne Victory W-League season was the club's tenth season in the W-League, the premier competition for women's football in Australia. The team played home games  at Epping Stadium, Lakeside Stadium and AAMI Park. The club was managed by Jeff Hopkins.

Players

Squad information

Transfers in

Transfers out

Contract extensions

Managerial staff

Squad statistics

Competitions

W-League

League table

Results summary

Results by round

Fixtures
 Click here for season fixtures.

References

External links
 Official Website

Melbourne Victory FC (A-League Women) seasons
Melbourne Victory